Rehab Doll is the only studio album by the American rock band Green River, released in June 1988 through Sub Pop Records.

Overview
Almost immediately following the release of Dry As a Bone, the group re-entered the studio in August 1987 to begin production on its first full-length album, Rehab Doll. The band initially started work on the album with producer Jack Endino at Reciprocal Recording in Seattle, Washington, however the band switched to producer Bruce Calder and changed its recording location to Steve Lawson Studios in Seattle. Band in-fighting, though, took center stage over the music. A stylistic division developed between bassist Jeff Ament and guitarist Stone Gossard on one side, and vocalist Mark Arm on the other. Ament and Gossard wanted to pursue a major-label deal, while Arm wanted to remain independent, viewing the duo as being too careerist. On October 31, 1987, Ament, Gossard and guitarist Bruce Fairweather stated their desire to quit the band.

Although the band members agreed to complete production of Rehab Doll during the next three months, Green River had by late October 1987 ceased as a band. The recording sessions for the album were completed in January 1988. The song "Swallow My Pride" originally appeared on the band's debut EP, Come on Down, and the song "Together We'll Never" was previously released as a single through Tasque Force Records in 1986. Both songs were re-recorded for this album. The cassette version of Rehab Doll also contains a cover of the David Bowie song "Queen Bitch". The album's cover art was photographed by Charles Peterson and a small portion of the Frye Hotel in Seattle is seen in the background.

The album was released in June 1988 on Sub Pop Records. Ned Raggett of Allmusic called it "a record that sounded caught somewhere between grunge mania and metal/corp rock folly." It was reissued in 1990 as part of the Dry as a Bone/Rehab Doll compilation album.

In 2019, the album was re-released with a new mix by original producer Jack Endino, and 10 bonus tracks.

Track listing

Cassette bonus track

Personnel

Green River
Jeff Ament – bass guitar, vocals, assistant production, inner sleeve design
Mark Arm – vocals, assistant production
Bruce Fairweather – guitars
Stone Gossard – guitars, vocals, assistant production
Alex Vincent – drums, percussion

Additional musicians and production
Bruce Calder – groaning, moaning, screeching on "Porkfist", engineering, production
Jack Endino – pre-production recording
Kim Gordon – sonic groan
Linda Owens – jacket design
Charles Peterson – photography
Sharka Stern – background vocals on "Swallow My Pride"

References

1988 debut albums
Green River (band) albums
Sub Pop albums